A Coehorn  (also spelled cohorn) is a lightweight mortar originally designed by Dutch military engineer Menno van Coehoorn.

Concept and design 

Van Coehoorn came to prominence during the 1688–97 Nine Years War, whose tactics have been summarised by historian John Childs as follows: "The majority of infantrymen never fired their muskets in anger;....armies were consciously geared towards the dominant forms of warfare; manoeuvre and the siege." This emphasis on siege warfare saw many developments in the use and design of artillery.

Fortifications were vulnerable to vertical trajectory or plunging fire, and the concept of mortars was well understood, but large scale mortars were commonly used initially to provide close support for infantry assaults on fortified positions. Van Coehoorn demonstrated them in May 1701 to William III of England, and they were first used in action at the siege of Kaiserswerth in 1702.

   
The original was light enough to be moved by as few as two men, although a four-man crew was more practical for rapid movement. It proved immediately popular; the 74 used at Kaiserswerth were increased to over 300 at Bonn six months later. Fortifications of the period were primarily designed to resist horizontal fire, making the vertical trajectory and plunging fire of the Coehorn highly effective at short range. It used a powder-filled, time-fused shell, the range being adjusted by changing the size of the charge. The slow muzzle velocity meant the shell's high, arching flight could be easily observed from ground level but was not necessarily a problem since their original purpose was to provide cover rather than inflict casualties.

While generally employed in siege warfare, they were also used by British government troops at the Battle of Glen Shiel in June 1719. At the siege of Vicksburg in 1863, the Union forces had so little artillery that "wooden [coehorns] were made by taking logs of the toughest wood that could be found, boring them out for six or twelve pound shells and binding them with strong iron bands" though overall the Federal siege artillery units in the 1861–1865 U.S. Civil War had both 12- and 24-pounder versions, with the Confederates constructing copies of the 24-pounder using rough iron.  After the outbreak of the First World War, trench warfare soon developed, and it became apparent that the British had nothing to match the German minenwerfer. While an effective British weapon was in development, Colonel Toby Rawlinson acquired 40 obsolete Coehorn mortars from the French army which became known as "Toby mortars" after him; they were used in action at the Battle of Neuve Chapelle and the Battle of Aubers during the spring of 1915. They were quickly retired on the arrival of the new Stokes mortars later that year.

The British Army used the Coehorn in the wars against the Maoris as the horizontal cannon shot would often not penetrate the thick woven barrier mats that were hung outside Maori fortifications to protect the wooden structures. The vertical trajectory and plunging fire of the Coehorns was very effective in this application.

Cannons resembling coehorns were made by the Hmong rebels in Vue Pa Chay's revolt. They were made with the trunks of trees, packed with scrap metal as projectiles and a large quantity of gunpowder. These cannons were said to have weighed over 200 lbs.

Firing process
By the time of the U.S. Civil War, the Instruction for Heavy Artillery suggested a crew of three using an 18-inch rammer and sponge, primer pouch, gunners pouch with level, and pincers with a quadrant and plummet for aiming. Range required adjustment in the size of the powder charge; the 24-pounder version could theoretically fire a 17" shell up to 1,200 yards or 1,100 metres, but this was optimistic. It generally employed a paper fuse with a known burn rate and a hollow conical wooden plug.

References

Mortars
Naval artillery
American Civil War artillery